Glenea colenda is a species of beetle in the family Cerambycidae. It was described by James Thomson in 1879. It is known from the Philippines.

References

colenda
Beetles described in 1879